Neil McMullin (born 11 January 1954) is a former Australian rules footballer who played with Melbourne in the Victorian Football League (VFL).

Notes

External links 		

		
Australian rules footballers from Victoria (Australia)		
Melbourne Football Club players
1954 births
Living people